Dyschirius braziliensis is a species of ground beetle in the subfamily Scaritinae. It was described by Fedorenko in 1999.

References

braziliensis
Beetles described in 1999